Northwest Florida Reception Center is a state prison for men located in Chipley, Washington County, Florida, owned and operated by the Florida Department of Corrections.  The facility was originally known as the "Washington Correctional Institution."  NWFRC opened in 1994 with a mix of security levels and a capacity of 1303.  

The adjacent Northwest Florida Reception Center Annex opened in 2008, and houses another 1415 inmates at the same security levels.   

NWFRC was described in press reports as "one of the state’s most notoriously violent prisons" as six correctional officers were arrested and charged with felony abuse against prisoners in September 2014.

References

Prisons in Florida
Buildings and structures in Washington County, Florida
1994 establishments in Florida